This article is about the demographics of the Ottoman Empire, including population density, ethnicity, education level, religious affiliations and other aspects of the population.

Lucy Mary Jane Garnett stated in the 1904 book Turkish Life in Town and Country, published in 1904, that "No country in the world, perhaps, contains a population so heterogeneous as that of Turkey."

Census 
Demographic data for most of the history of the Ottoman Empire is not quite precise. For most of the five centuries of its existence, the empire did not have easily computable valid data except figures for the number of employed citizens. Until the first official census (1881–1893), data was derived from extending the taxation values to the total population. Because of the use of taxation data to infer population size, detailed data for numerous Ottoman urban centers - towns with more than 5,000 inhabitants - is accurate. This data was collaborated with data on wages and prices. Another source was used for the numbers of landlords of households in the Ottoman Empire- every household was assumed to have 5 residents.

1831 Ottoman census
Entire villages remained uncounted. Taxable population was enumerated, i.e. healthy men over 15 years old. For some settlements the rest of the male population was the majority.

1844 Ottoman census

1881-1893 Ottoman census 

The first official census (1881–1893) took 10 years to finish. In 1893 the results were compiled and presented. This census is the first modern, general and standardized census accomplished not for taxation nor for military purposes, but to acquire demographic data. The population was divided into ethno-religious and gender characteristics. Numbers of both male and female subjects are given in ethno-religious categories including Muslims, Greeks (including Greek Macedonians, Asia Minor Greeks, Pontic Greeks, and Caucasus Greeks, all Orthodox Christians under the Greek Orthodox Patriarchate of Constantinople from extremely distinct ethnic origin), Armenians, Macedonian Slavs, Bulgarians, Catholics, Jews, Protestants, Latins, Syriacs and Roma.

In 1867 the Council of States took charge of drawing population tables, increasing the precision of population records. They introduced new measures of recording population counts in 1874. This led to the establishment of a General Population Administration, attached to the Ministry of Interior in 1881–1882. These changes politicized the population counts.

1905-1906 Ottoman census 

After 1893 the Ottoman Empire established a statistics authority (Istatistik-i Umumi Idaresi) under which results of another official census was published in 1899.

Istatistik-i Umumi Idaresi conducted a new census survey for which field work lasted two years (1905–06). 2-3 million people in Iraq and Syria remained unregistered and uncounted.
As a factual note this survey's complete (total) documentation was not published. Results of regional studies on this data were published later, which were sorted by their publication date. Included in the publication and subsequent ones was the Ottoman Empire's population as of 1911, 1912, and 1914. The substantial archival documentation on the census has been used in many modern studies and international publications. After 1906 the Ottoman Empire began to disband and a chain of violent wars such as the Italo-Turkish War, Balkan Wars and World War I drastically changed the region, its borders, and its demographics.

1914 Ottoman census

1866 Danube Vilayet census
In 1865, 658600 (40,51%) Muslims and 967058 (59,49%) non-Muslims, including females, were living in the province excluding Niş sanjak and 569.868 (34,68%) Muslims, apart from the immigrants and 1.073.496 (65,32%) non-Muslims in 1859–1860. Half the Muslims were refugees from a population exchange of Christians and Muslims with Russia. Before the establishment of the Danube Vilayet, some 250000-300000 Muslim immigrants from Crimea and Caucasus had been settled in this region from 1855 to 1864. Another 200–300,000 male and female Circassian and Crimean Tatar refugees settled in 1862-1878 were to a degree excluded from the 1866 census count.

Male population of the taxable population of the, Danube Vilayet:

Percentage of communities in towns from the male population in 1866 according to Ottoman teskere:

In 1873, 17,96% of the population of the province were living in the urban areas.

1874 Danube Vilayet census
According to the 1874 census, there were 963596 (42,22%) Muslims and 1318506 (57,78%) non-Muslims in the Danube Province excluding Nış sanjak. Together with the sanjak of Nish the population consisted of 1055650 (40,68%) Muslims and 1539278 (59,32%) non-Muslims in 1874. Muslims were the majority in the sanjaks of Rusçuk, Varna and Tulça, while the non-Muslims were in majority in the rest of the sanjaks.

Eastern Rumelia census
Census in Eastern Rumelia of 1878:

Census of Eastern Rumelia in 1880:

The ethnic composition of the population of Eastern Rumelia, according to the provincial census taken in 1884, was the following:

Population of Eastern Rumelia according to the 1880 census:

1903-1904 census of Salonika Vilayet
Population of the Salonika vilayet:

Ethnoreligious estimates and registered population

Eyalets
The Muslim population in Silistra subprovince was most numerous (55.17%), while in the Vidin and Nis subprovinces the non-Muslim population constituted 75.59% and 81.18% respectively. Population of the eyalets (Silistra, Vidin and Niş) which constituted the establishment of the Danube Vilayet, according to the 1858 report of the British consul Edward Neale:

Danube Vilayet
The Danube Province was founded in 1864 and consisted of the subprovinces of Ruse, Varna, Tulcea, Tarnovo, Vidin, Sofia and Niş. Two subprovinces (Sofia and Niş) were separated from the Danube Province, so that Niş sanjak was part of Prizren Vilayet in 1869–1874, while the detached Sofia Province was founded in 1876, and finally both Sofia and Niş were annexed to Adrianople and Kosovo Vilayets respectively in 1877.

The entire population of the province, reached ca. 2,6 Millions, including 1 Million (40%) Muslims and 1.5 Million (60%) non-Muslims before the Russo-Turkish War of 1877-1878, with the main national components consisting of Bulgarians and Turks. New large communities of Circassians and Tatars were resettled in the province among the 250,000-300,000 Muslim refugees from Crimea and the Caucasus from 1855 to 1864; however, after the war of 1877–78, both the Muslim and Turkish population dropped by almost half, leaving only 63 Circassians recorded in Bulgaria by 1880.

The male population of the Danube Vilayet (excluding Niş sancak) in 1865, according to Kuyûd-ı Atîk (the Danube Vilayet printing press):

The male population of the Danube Vilayet (excluding Niş sanjak) in 1866–1873, according to the editor of the Danube newspaper Ismail Kemal:

The male population of the Danube Vilayet (excluding Niş sanjak) in 1868, according to Kemal Karpat:

The male population of the Danube Vilayet (excluding Niş sanjak) in 1875, according to Tahrir-i Cedid (the Danube Vilayet printing press):

The male population of the Danube Vilayet in 1876, according to the Ottoman officer Stanislas Saint Clair:

The total population of the Danube Vilayet (including Niş and Sofia sanjaks), according to the 1876 edition of Encyclopaedia Britannica:

The total Population of the Danube Vilayet (excluding Niş sanjak) in 1876, estimated by the French consul Aubaret from the register:

The total population of the two mainly Turkish sanjaks of the Danube Vilayet in 1876, according to the French consul Aubaret:

Adrianople Vilayet
Total population of the Adrianople Vilayet in 1878 according to the Turkish author Kemal Karpat:

Male population of the Filibe Sancak of the Adrianople Vilayet in 1876 according to the British R. J. Moore:

Male population of İslimiye sanjak of Adrianople Vilayet in 1873 according to Ottoman almanacs:

Male population of İslimiye sanjak of Adrianople Vilayet in 1875 according to British R.J. Moore:

Total population of the Sanjak of Gümülcine of the Adrianople Vilayet In the 19th century:

Eastern Rumelia
Total population of the later Eastern Rumelia before and after the Russo-Turkish War of 1877-78 (Drummons-Wolff to Salisbury, 26.09.1878) after forced migration:

Constantinople Vilayet
Population of Istanbul in 1885 according to Stanford Shaw (Male:female):

Salonika Vilayet

Male population of some sanjaks in 1880 according to Earl Granville:

Male population of some sanjaks in 1878 according to Bulgarian Kusev and Gruev:

Total population of some sanjaks in 1881 according to Italian Hondros:

Total population of some sanjaks according to vice-consul Stanislas Recchioli in 1878:

Total
Total population according to Abdolonyme Ubicini who based the statistics on the Ottoman census of 1844:

European part
Estimates in some eighteen sources show that the Muslims constituted about 35% of the total Balkan population during the first half of the 19th century, while in the second half of the century the proportion grew to 43%. According to thirty-three sources, the proportion of Turks in the European provinces during the 19th century ranges from 11 to 24 percent; of Greeks from 9 to 16 percent; of Bulgarians from 24 to 39 percent. The Turks made up two thirds of the Muslims in the Danube Vilayet and most of them in the Adrianople Vilayet and Salonika Vilayet. In the more western vilayets, the Muslims were a majority, which consisted usually of Slavs and Albanians. In the Ioannina Vilayet, the Orthodox Christians were dominant, a majority of whom were ethnically Albanian according to Ottoman officials and were also three fourths of the Muslims. In 1867, Salaheddin Bey estimated 595,000 Circassian newcomers and 400,000 Armenians in the European part. Practically all of the Circassians began migrating to Anatolia after the Russian military advances in the last quarter of the century.

Total population of the European part in 1831 according to David Urquhart:

Total population of the European part in the 1840s according to Auguste Viquesnel:

Total population of European part in 1872 according to the military attaché in Constantinople Ritter zur Helle von Samo based on Ottoman province yearbooks:

Total population of the European part in 1876 according to Ernst Georg Ravenstein who relied on several sources including Ottoman statistics:

Total population of some sanjaks in 1877 according to Russian diplomat Teplov:

Population of the sanjaks according to a Greek author:

Male Population of the parts of the Danube, Adrianople and Salonika vilayets corresponding to the modern Republic of Bulgaria in 1875 according to Totev:

Special Reports

Arnold J. Toynbee 
During the World War I; The treatment of Armenians in the Ottoman Empire was a book by Viscount Bryce and Arnold J. Toynbee which compiled statements from eyewitnesses from other countries including Germany, Italy, the Netherlands, Sweden, and Switzerland, who similarly attested to Armenians in the Ottoman Empire during 1915–1916. The publication presents Arnold J. Toynbee's analysis on Armenian population in the Ottoman Empire. A summary table of his analysis included in the page 199. In the "vilayet of Van", there were two portions, portions in modern use corresponds to county. As explained by Arnold J. Toynbee in the footprint at page 199, he developed his analysis by excluding certain portions of the province where he said "Armenians were a minor". Arnold Toynbee in finding the ratio of Armenians in vilayet of Van; he removed the values originating from portions of Van (listed in the foot print) where Armenians were in minority. The presented table in page 1999 shows the re-calculated values by Arnold J. Toynbee of these selected provinces using values of the parts (counties, sanjacks) which Armenians were not in minority. The presented map shows the re-calculated values of the stated provinces using values where Armenians are not in minority.

See also 
Subdivisions of the Ottoman Empire

Articles discussing the demographics of the Ottoman Empire:
Demographics of Turkey
Ottoman Armenian population
History of the Jews in the Ottoman Empire
Demographics of Kosovo

Notes

References

Bibliography 
 
 * 
 
 L. Kinross, The Ottoman Centuries: The Rise and Fall of the Turkish Empire, 1979
 M. Kabadayı, Inventory for the Ottoman Empire / Turkish Republic 1500–2000